Swamp Brothers is an American reality television series. The series premiered on May 10, 2011, on Discovery Channel.

Series overview

Episodes

References

External links
 

2010s American reality television series
2011 American television series debuts
2012 American television series endings
Discovery Channel original programming